Richard Kriesche (born 28 October 1940 in Vienna) is an Austrian artist. He is considered one of the most productive and influential contemporary artists in Austria.

Life and work
From 1958 to 1963 he studied at the Academy of Fine Arts and at the University of Vienna. In 1991 Kriesche was appointed to the Hochschule für Gestaltung Offenbach. In 1995-96 he took over a guest professorship at the École des Beaux-Arts in Paris. In 1996 he was appointed deputy head of the science department in the Office of the Styrian Provincial Government and in 1998 was appointed to the culture department. From 2003 to 2005 Kriesche worked at the Landesmuseum Joanneum Graz.

His artistic fields of work include photo art, video art, computer art, net art, installations, performance and multimedia art. In his works, Kriesche attempts to bridge the gap between the genetic micro-worlds and the macro-worlds of the universe. With his sculptures and installations, Kriesche has been represented at numerous major media and art events. (Documenta, Biennale etc.).

For his lifetime achievements, he was awarded the Austrian Decoration for Science and Art.

Exhibitionshttps://ars.electronica.art/press/files/2010/09/Richard-Kriesche_Unterlage_EN.pdf 
 Biennale di Venezia, Venice, 1968, 1986, 1995 (Honorable Mention)
 documenta 6, Kassel, 1977
 documenta 8, Kassel, 1987
 Ars Electronica, Linz, 1989, 1994, 2003 ("featured artist")
 Musée d'art moderne, Paris
 Centre Pompidou, Paris
 Museum of Modern Art, New York, 1978
 Institute of Contemporary Art, Los Angeles;
 Museum Moderner Kunst, Vienna
 Massachusetts Institute of Technology, Media Lab
 Washington Project for the Arts
 trigon 73, Graz
 Artsat - Mir, 1991

References 

1940 births
Living people